Burnlee is a village in the Holme Valley in Kirklees, West Yorkshire, England. It is bordered by the settlements of Holmfirth, Upperthong and Hinchcliffe Mill.

References

External links

Villages in West Yorkshire
Geography of Holmfirth